IBM LAN Server is a discontinued network operating system introduced by International Business Machines (IBM) in 1988. LAN Server started as a close cousin of Microsoft's LAN Manager and first shipped in early 1988. It was originally designed to run on top of Operating System/2 (OS/2) Extended Edition. The network client was called IBM LAN Requester and was included with OS/2 EE 1.1 by default. (Eventually IBM shipped other clients and supported yet more. Examples include the IBM OS/2 File/Print Client, IBM OS/2 Peer, and client software for Microsoft Windows.) Here the short term LAN Server refers to the IBM OS/2 LAN Server product. There were also LAN Server products for other operating systems, notably AIX—now called Fast Connect—and OS/400.

Version history

Predecessors included IBM PC LAN Program (PCLP). Variants included LAN Server Ultimedia (optimized for network delivery of multimedia files) and LAN On-Demand. Add-ons included Directory and Security Server, Print Services Facility/2 (later known as Advanced Printing), Novell NetWare for OS/2, and LAN Server for Macintosh.

Innovations
LAN Server pioneered certain file and print sharing concepts such as domains (and domain controllers), networked COM ports, domain aliases, and automatic printer driver selection and installation.

See also
 LAN messenger
 Server Message Block (SMB)

References

Further reading
 

Computer-related introductions in 1988
LAN Server
Network operating systems
OS/2
Servers (computing)